Nahum Barnet (16 August 1855 – 1 September 1931) was an architect working in Melbourne, Victoria, Australia during the Victorian and Edwardian periods.

Barnet was born in the Melbourne Hospital on Swanston Street, the son of a Polish-born pawnbroker, jeweller and tobacconist.  He was an active member of Melbourne's Jewish community, serving on many committees and often writing letters to the Jewish press.

Barnet was a successful and prolific architect, emerging in the 1880s with major works, and unlike some other boom era architects, practiced again after 1900, producing some of this most original and attractive designs. He worked in a range of styles and on a wide range of buildings, but is best known for his extensive legacy of commercial buildings in Melbourne's CBD.

Barnet first came to attention in the early 1880s, advocating a new approach to Australian architecture. For instance, he submitted a letter to the Argus in 1880 detailing his views that the then ubiquitous stucco and Renaissance styles should be abandoned in favour of a colourful, new style using materiality such as terracotta, faïence and tiles, though his own work was never quite that radical.

Major works include Rosaville, an unusual and highly decorated two storey terrace in Carlton (1883), the Renaissance Revival style Her Majesty's Theatre (1886), the Queen Anne Austral Building (1891) in Collins Street, the Romanesque / Queen Anne Alston's Corner (1904), the Edwardian Baroque Empire Building (1905) on Flinders Street, the unusual red brick Wertheim Piano Factory (later used as the studios for television station GTV-9) in inner suburban Richmond (1909), the Romanesque / Queen Anne Auditorium Building (1913), the Gothic Revival Francis & Co Chemist at 280-282 Bourke Street (1913), and his last work, the Melbourne Synagogue (1929) in South Yarra.

Barnet's Edwardian-era work commercial work was often designed in the local version of the Edwardian style popular in the period 1899-1913. This was derived from the American Romanesque Revival, combined with elements of the Queen Anne, characterised by the use of red brick and tall arches. Barnet decorated some of his essays in this style with Art Nouveau details, relatively rare in Melbourne.  Barnet's own Austral building of 1891 was one of the first to introduce the Queen Anne style to city's streetscapes, and his Auditorium Building of 1913, one of the last.

The popular claim that there was not a street in Melbourne's CBD where a Barnet building could not be found was first coined by Isaac Selby and reiterated in Barnet's obituary in The Argus in 1931.   The obituary relates that when challenged with the street "Carpentaria Place" (a short street opposite the Windsor Hotel, now pedestrianised), the reply was "You are wrong. You have overlooked the cabman's shelter." Barnet had designed this in 1898, and it still exists, though relocated to Yarra Park along Brunton Avenue some time in the interwar years.

He died in St Kilda, 1 September 1931.

Gallery of works

References

1855 births
1931 deaths
Australian Jews
Australian people of Polish-Jewish descent
Architects from Melbourne
Jewish architects